Moana is one of the suburbs of Nelson, New Zealand.

There are two small local parks in Moana: Bisley Reserve and Bruno Reserve. Both are owned and operated by Nelson City Council.

Demographics

Tahuna Hills had a population of 2,847 at the 2018 New Zealand census, an increase of 195 people (7.4%) since the 2013 census, and an increase of 417 people (17.2%) since the 2006 census. There were 1,149 households. There were 1,470 males and 1,377 females, giving a sex ratio of 1.07 males per female. The median age was 47 years (compared with 37.4 years nationally), with 438 people (15.4%) aged under 15 years, 417 (14.6%) aged 15 to 29, 1,422 (49.9%) aged 30 to 64, and 570 (20.0%) aged 65 or older.

Ethnicities were 90.2% European/Pākehā, 9.2% Māori, 1.9% Pacific peoples, 4.2% Asian, and 2.4% other ethnicities (totals add to more than 100% since people could identify with multiple ethnicities).

The proportion of people born overseas was 24.8%, compared with 27.1% nationally.

Although some people objected to giving their religion, 59.4% had no religion, 28.9% were Christian, 0.4% were Hindu, 0.2% were Muslim, 1.1% were Buddhist and 2.1% had other religions.

Of those at least 15 years old, 675 (28.0%) people had a bachelor or higher degree, and 291 (12.1%) people had no formal qualifications. The median income was $36,700, compared with $31,800 nationally. The employment status of those at least 15 was that 1,245 (51.7%) people were employed full-time, 384 (15.9%) were part-time, and 66 (2.7%) were unemployed.

References

Suburbs of Nelson, New Zealand
Populated places in the Nelson Region
Populated places around Tasman Bay / Te Tai-o-Aorere